Amarda Road Airstrip, also known as Rasgovindpur Airstrip is a former wartime airfield located near Rasgovindpur village in Mayurbhanj district of Odisha, India. It was used by the Royal Indian Air Force during World War II.

History

The Amarda Road airstrip, as it was called in war terminology, spreads across an area of nearly 900 acres. Built in the 1940s at a cost of Rs 3 crore, it was eventually abandoned after the war. It was probably named as Amarda Road Airfield because of the nearby Amarda Road railway station. The airfield was used by No. 136 Squadron RAF, No. 177 Squadron RAF and No. 607 Squadron RAF. The 'Air Fighting Training Unit', formed in February 1943, was also based here.

As an airfield, Amarda Road fell on the supply route for the Nationalist Armies of China in their fight against the Japanese. Aircraft of the RAF and the United States Army Air Forces (USAAF) would regularly fly from this space to China via Chabua (Dibrugarh), Jorhat and Vijaynagar across the infamous hump route over Arunachal and East Tibet.

Amarda Road and other neighbouring airfields - Dhalbhumgarh, Dudhkundi, Salua, Digri, Salbani and Chakulia - formed a web of airfields created by the Allies to stop the impending Japanese advance in the east. During the war, Amarda Road was, to put it simply, a battle hub. After the war was over, most airfields, including this one, fell into disuse. Today, only the Kalaikunda airstrip, which was declared an Air Force Station in 1954, exists.

Present condition
Eight decades after the base was built, the  concrete runway is still intact, though the buildings that once cluttered the edges are gone.

There are proposals to renovate the airstrip for future operations under UDAN scheme from 2022. As of November 2022, the Government of India and the Ministry of Defence have cleared for the airstrip to be developed as a commercial airport by acquiring a land area of 160 acres, and developing it at a cost of ₹ 25 crores.

Gallery

References

Amarda
Amarda
Amarda
Amarda
World War II sites in India
1940s establishments in India